The following highways are numbered 533:

Canada
Ontario Highway 533

United States